Gretta Lange Bader (née Margaret Marie Lange; May 25, 1931 – August 1, 2014) was an American sculptor best known for her bronze portrait work.

Biography
Margaret Marie Lange was educated at Pomona College, where she met her future husband William B. Bader, graduating in 1953. She studied at the Academy of Fine Arts Munich after marrying Bader. She continued studying art at the Corcoran School of Art and the Rhode Island School of Design. She taught at the Art League School in Alexandria, Virginia, chairing its Department of Sculpture from 1984 to 1989. She was a visiting scholar at the American Academy in Rome.

With her husband, she had four children, Christopher, Katharine, John and actor Diedrich Bader. She died of congestive heart failure in Washington, D.C., on August 1, 2014, aged 83.

Works
Sculptures by Bader can be found in the National Portrait Gallery and the National Building Museum.

She completed over 30 full-size portrait sculptures, including sculptures of J. William Fulbright (at the University of Arkansas), Frank Church, Claiborne Pell, Donald Ross (at Pinehurst Resort), and Ben Bradlee, former editor of The Washington Post. She completed hundreds of busts, including 234 designed in 1984 for the National Building Museum.

References

1931 births
2014 deaths
German emigrants to the United States
Sculptors from New Jersey
People from Essex County, New Jersey
Pomona College alumni
Rhode Island School of Design alumni
American women sculptors
Academy of Fine Arts, Munich alumni
20th-century American sculptors
21st-century American sculptors
20th-century American women artists
21st-century American women artists